The Scout and Guide movement in Canada is served by many separate organizations, some with various national and international affiliations.

National and International affiliations

WOSM member associations

In Canada, two Scouting associations cooperate for membership in the World Organization of the Scout Movement (WOSM):

 Association des Scouts du Canada
 Scouts Canada

Canada is the only country that has more than one WOSM member association without a national federation. Scouts Canada and Association des Scouts du Canada send a joint delegation to meetings of the World Organization of the Scout Movement. This is coordinated through the Committee on Cooperation.

Affiliated to Scouts Canada are the  Salvation Army Life Saving Scouts.

WAGGGS member association

The Guiding association within the World Association of Girl Guides and Girl Scouts is Girl Guides of Canada.

UIGSE member associations

There is one association affiliated with the UIGSE-FSE, with six groups in Ontario and one in Quebec:
 Federation of North-American Explorers

WFIS member associations
Canada has several associations which trace their roots to the Baden-Powell Scouts' Association in the United Kingdom. Some of them are members of the World Federation of Independent Scouts.

 BP Service Association in Canada
 Canadian Traditional Scouting Association (WFIS Prospect Member)
 ZHR Polish Scouts of Canada

Independent associations

There are also a number of independent Scouting and Guiding associations active in Canada. Among them are
 Association des aventuriers de Baden-Powell — Adventurers Association of Baden-Powell (AABP)
 Israeli Scouts of Toronto (Shevet Hermon), affiliated to Hebrew Scouts Movement in Israel
 Plast - Ukrainian Youth Association of Canada
 Związek Harcerstwa Polskiego Canada (ZHPpgk): Polish Scouting Association in Canada Inc., a Polish émigré organization, not connected to Związek Harcerstwa Polskiego in Poland.
 Les Guides Franco-canadiennes

History of Scouting in Canada

According to the book 75 Years of Scouting in Canada, the first Scouting groups in Canada were founded in 1908, the same year Baden-Powell's book, Scouting for Boys was published. St. Catharines and Merrickville are mentioned as among the locations of the first troops.

Scouts Canada states "There is evidence that a few Scouting groups started up in Canada in 1907", but provides no further details.

Chums Scouts, British Boy Scouts, the World Scouts, Girl Peace Scouts and Life Saving Scouts of the Salvation Army, Boys' Brigade scouts, Church Lads' Brigade scouts and Lone Scouts of America all operated in Canada.

Separate Canadian-originated and based organizations of boy scouts were formed as early as 1909 with some Provinces having competing organizations. The Canadian Scouts existed from 1917 to the early 1930s, mainly in Ontario.

Scouts Canada was formed in 1914 as the Canadian General Council of The Boy Scouts Association of the United Kingdom.

Numerous Francophone and Francophone Catholic scout organizations were established in Canada from the 1910s. See also Association des Scouts du Canada.

Armenian Scouts, Latvian, Estonian and Lithuanian Scouts, Polish Scouts, Plast Ukrainian Scouts, Russian Scouts in Exile and Hungarian Scouts were all well established in the late 1940s.

Canadian Scouting in stamps
On 6 July 1983 Canada Post issued 'Scouting, 1908-1983' designed by François Dallaire, based on a drawing by Marc Fournier. The 32¢ stamps are perforated 13.5 mm and were printed by Ashton-Potter Limited.

References